Haji Heybat mosque is a historical mosque of the XVIII century. It is a part of Old City and located on Kichik Gala street, in the city of Baku, in Azerbaijan.

History
The mosque was built in 1791 (1206 of Hijri calendar). It was constructed by architect Hаji Hеybat Amir Ali оghlu.

Architectural features
The mosque is small and it is on the row of neighborhoods. In plan, the mosque is in the form of a quadrangle. It consists of a square shaped vestibule, a service room and a worshipping room with niches.

The architectural-constructive structure of the mosque is in a local style. The mosque also consists of stone domes and pointed arches. Simply expressed entrance with crown and epigraphic inscriptions on topics of Quran and information about the architect of the monument indicate value of the mosque. At interior of the worshipping room, in one of the corners, there is a grave of the architect and his wife.

Gallery

See also
Khidir Mosque
Sheikh Ibrahim Mosque

References

Mosques in Baku
18th-century mosques
Icherisheher